Doordarshan Arunprabha (DD Arun Prabha) is an Indian satellite television channel, which was launched on 9 February 2019 by Prime Minister of India Narendra Modi. It is Doordarshan's second channel for North East and first for Arunachal Pradesh.

Doordarshan Arunprabha TV channel is available on DD Free dish DTH at channel no. 11. DD Itanagar was replaced by DD Arun Prabha.

See also
 DD Arunachal Pradesh

References 

Doordarshan
Satellite television
Hindi-language television channels in India
Television channels and stations established in 2019
Culture of Arunachal Pradesh